Ball in the Family is an American reality television series that premiered on August 29, 2017 on Facebook Watch. The show documents the personal and professional lives of the Ball family. The sixth season premiered on October 18, 2020.

Cast

Main

 Lonzo Ball, the eldest son in the Ball family, and current guard for the Chicago Bulls
 LiAngelo Ball, the middle son in the Ball family, and current guard for the Greensboro Swarm
 LaMelo Ball, the youngest son in the Ball family, and current guard for the Charlotte Hornets
 LaVar Ball, the patriarch of the Ball family, owner of Big Baller Brand, and founder of Junior Basketball Association
 Tina Ball, the matriarch of the Ball family

Recurring

 Denise Garcia, Lonzo's on and off girlfriend and mother of his daughter
 Zoey Ball, Lonzo and Denise's baby daughter
 Alan Foster (seasons 1–4), LaVar's former business partner
 Darren "DMO" Moore, Lonzo’s manager and family friend
 Horace, family friend
 Noni Slatinsky, Tina's mother
 Robert Slatinsky, Tina's father
 Anderson Ball, LaVar's father
 Maria Ball, LaVar's mother
 LaValle Ball, LaVar's brother
 Ren Ball, LaVar's brother
'Dre Ball, LaVar's brother
 Jhaylen Ball, LaVar's niece
 Andre Ball, LaVar's nephew

Episodes

Series overview

Season 1 (2017)

In the last episode, it is revealed that Lamelo Ball is dating Ashley Alvano (they later break up in January/February 2019).

Season 2 (2017–18)

Season 3 (2018)

Season 4 (2018–19)

Season 5 (2019–20)

Season 6 (2020)

Production

Development
On July 5, 2017, it was announced that Facebook had greenlit a then-untitled reality show starring the Ball family. The number and length of episodes had yet to be determined at the time. On October 17, 2017, it was announced that Facebook had renewed the show for a second season. On May 14, 2018, it was reported that the show had been renewed for a third season.

The show is referred to internally by Facebook as one of their "hero shows" alongside other programs such as Strangers and Returning the Favor.

Music
The series' theme song was "Big Bag" by Wes Period. A friend of Period's was working with the Ball family to find music for the show and told him about it. Period came to them with his song and they told him that they would use in the end credits of an episode. Instead, the producers of the series ended up making it the show's official theme.

Reception

Critical response
The first season was met with a generally positive reception from critics. Haley O'Shaughnessy of The Ringer claimed that the show "combines everything you’d expect with a touch of nuance and sympathy." Myron Medcalf of ESPN compared the show favorably to other Bunim/Murray production Keeping Up with the Kardashians saying that "unlike the Kardashians, who never really care about authenticity, Ball in the Family tries to be sympathetic to the Ball patriarch while showing his brashness isn’t just there to generate social media buzz."

Viewership
The show premiered on Facebook Watch on August 29, 2017 and the first episode was viewed by more than 26 million people.

Awards and nominations

See also
 List of original programs distributed by Facebook Watch

References

External links
 
 

Facebook Watch original programming
2010s American reality television series
2017 American television series debuts
2020 American television series endings
English-language television shows
American non-fiction web series
Television series by Bunim/Murray Productions